This article attempts to list the oldest buildings in the state of Vermont in the United States of America, including the oldest houses in Vermont and any other surviving structures from the eighteenth century period or the oldest of its type.  Some dates are approximate and based on architectural studies and historical records, other dates are based on dendrochronology. All entries should include citation with reference to: architectural features; a report by an architectural historian; or dendrochronology.

List

See also 
 Oldest buildings in America
 Timeline of architectural styles

Notes 

Vermont
Oldest buildings